Dinka spirituality refers to the traditional religion of the Dinka people (also known as Muonyjang people), an ethnic group of South Sudan. They belong to the Nilotic peoples, which is a group of cultures in Southern Sudan and wider Eastern Africa. The Dinka people largely rejected or ignored Islamic (and Christian) teachings, as Abrahamic religious beliefs were incompatible with their society, culture and traditional beliefs.

Creation 
The supreme, creator god, Nhialic, is the god of the sky and rain, and the ruler of all the other gods and spirits. He is generally seen as distant from humans. Nhialic is also known as Jaak, Juong or Dyokin by other Nilotic groups such as the Nuer and Shilluk. Nhialac created ex-nihilo and rarely involves itself with the affairs of humans.

There are several versions of the Dinka creation myth which mainly concerns itself with the creation of humans. The first humans are Garang and Abuk. In some cases Nhialac created humans by blowing them out of its nose, other accounts say humans originated from the sky and were placed in the river where they came as fully formed adults. Other accounts say that humans were molded as clay figures and placed to mature in pots. Garang and Abuk were made out of the clay of Sudan.

Nhialac told them to multiply and that their children would die but would come back to life within 15 days. Garang protested that if nobody dies permanently then there would not be enough food. Nhialac then introduced permanent death. Nhialac commanded them to only plant one seed of grain a day or gave them one grain to eat a day. Being hungry, everyday Abuk made a paste with the grain to make the food last longer. However, when Abuk disobeyed and planted more Nhialac cut the rope that connected Heaven and Earth.

Pantheon
The Dinka have a pantheon of deities, most notable:

 Nhialic, creator god
 Ayum, goddess of the wind. She is often referred to as a force that prevents rain from falling.
 Alwet, goddess of the rain.
 Aja.
 Nyanngol, also known as Nyanwol or Nyancar, a female goddess.
 Gerrang, also known as Garang.Johnston (1934) described him as a malicious god who often leads humans to commit sins, while Lienhardt (1961) portrays him as a healer deity, though Lienhardt also confirms that the Dinka people tend to attribute misfortunes to Gerrang.
 Ayak, counterpart to Ayum, a female goddess.
 Deng
 Abum

Dengdit or Deng, is the sky god of rain and fertility.  Deng's mother is Abuk, the patron goddess of gardening and all women, represented by a snake.

The term "Jok" refers to a group of ancestral spirits and patron deities of tribes.

Invocation of prayer 
The Dinka address their prayers first to the Supreme Being Nhialic then invoke other deities.

The Dinka offer prayers for receiving mild weather. They also pray for good harvest, protection of people, cattle recovery from illness, and good hunting.

Sacrifices of a bull or ox are offered to Nhialic. The Dinka perform sacrifices along with prayers. The invokes all clan-divinities, free-divinities and ancestral spirits and at times Nhialic. Those who are saying the prayers hold a fishing spear in their hands. Short phrases expressing the need are chanted while the spear is thrust at the animal to be sacrificed. The participants repeat the words of the leader. At times of crisis or an important occasion the Dinka will continue to pray and sacrifice for long periods of time.

Stages of sacrificial prayer.

1.    The Leader describes the issue the people are facing.

2.    The Leader and all present Acknowledge past sins.

3.    Praise is offered singing hymns of honor or ox-songs.

4.    Expulsion of the misfortune to the sacrificial animal.

Animism 

The Dinka are also animists. They have a Pastoral lifestyle. The Dinka inherit a totem from both their parents. The faithful are expected to make offerings to their totem force and maintain positive relations with members. Eating or hurting your totem animal is a bad omen for those who share a totem. Some totems are believed to endow powers. The owl totem, for example, is believed to give the power of providence. Totems are not exclusively animals, although most are; some Dinka having as their totem a metallic ore or element.

In the Dinka language, a totem is known as a kuar. Dinka do not worship their totems but rather speak of being "related" to them.

Snakes 
Some Dinka people respect African puff adders. The most commonly respected snakes are Atemyath, Biar keroor, and Maluang. These snakes are given offerings of locally-made melted cheese to appease them, after which they are released into the forest. Killing snakes is believed to be a bad omen for the community or the individual, with the assumption that spirits may strike the killer.

References

Bibliography
 Lienhardt, Godfrey, "Divinity and Experience: The Religion of the Dinka", Oxford University Press (1988),    (Retrieved : 9 June 2012)
  Evens, T. M. S., "Anthropology As Ethics: Nondualism and the Conduct of Sacrifice", Berghahn Books (2009),  
  
 Jenkins, Dr. Orville B. “The Dinka Of South Sudan.” Profile of the Dinka People of South Sudan, http://strategyleader.org/profiles/dinka.html.
 Olupona, Jacob K., and Julian E. Kunnie. "African Indigenous Religions." Worldmark Encyclopedia of Religious Practices, edited by Gale, 2nd edition, 2015. Credo Reference, https://proxy.yc.edu/login?url=https://search.credoreference.com/content/entry/galewrp/african_indigenous_religions/0?institutionId=5330. Accessed 27 Oct. 2022.

External links 

 Library of Congress: Country Studies: Sudan
  Evens, T. M. S., "Anthropology As Ethics: Nondualism and the Conduct of Sacrifice", Berghahn Books (2009),  

Animism in Africa
Dinka mythology
Ethnic religion